Lu Jingjing was the defending champion, but lost to the 3rd seeded Tetiana Luzhanska in the first round.

Japanese veteran Kimiko Date-Krumm won the title beating sixth seeded Tímea Babos 6–3, 6–3 in the final.

Seeds

Main draw

Finals

Top half

Bottom half

Qualifying

Seeds

Qualifiers

Draw

First qualifier

Second qualifier

Third qualifier

Fourth qualifier

References
 Main Draw
 Qualifying Draw

Blossom Cup - Singles
Industrial Bank Cup